Dillon River Wildland Park is a wildland provincial park in northern Alberta, Canada that is  in size. It is located in the northeast portion of the province within the Regional Municipality of Wood Buffalo, encompassing lands west of the Saskatchewan boundary between Gipsy-Gordon Wildland Park to the north and the Cold Lake Air Weapons Range to the south. The Government of Alberta announced its creation through its approval of the Lower Athabasca Regional Plan in August 2012.

References 

Parks in Alberta
Regional Municipality of Wood Buffalo
2012 establishments in Alberta
Protected areas established in 2012